Noah Loosli (born 23 January 1997) is a Swiss professional footballer who plays as a centre-back for Grasshoppers.

Club career
Loosli made his professional debut in the Swiss Super League for Grasshoppers on 21 November 2015 in a game against Vaduz.

On 17 August 2021, he returned to Grasshoppers on a two-year contract.

On 13 March 2023, he signed with German Bundesliga side VfL Bochum, whom he would join for the 2023–24 season. His contract would run until summer 2026 and is valid for both Bundesliga and 2. Bundesliga.

International career
Loosli participated in the 2014 UEFA European Under-17 Championship with the Switzerland U17 national team.

References

External links
 

1997 births
Footballers from Zürich
Living people
Swiss men's footballers
Association football central defenders
Switzerland youth international footballers
Switzerland under-21 international footballers
Swiss Super League players
Swiss Challenge League players
Grasshopper Club Zürich players
FC Wohlen players
FC Schaffhausen players
FC Lausanne-Sport players